Étienne Souriau (April 26, 1892 – November 19, 1979) was a French philosopher, best known for his work in aesthetics.

Biography
Son of Paul Souriau, he studied at the École Normale Supérieure and received his agrégation of philosophy in 1925. After teaching at the universities of Aix-en-Provence and Lyon he eventually became a professor at the Sorbonne, where he held a chair in aesthetics. He was the editor of the Revue d'esthétique and was elected to the Académie des sciences morales et politiques in 1958. Recently, the works of Bruno Latour have reawoken interests on Souriau's oeuvre, specially his works on ontology and metaphysics regarding his theories of different modes of existence.

Works
 L'Abstraction sentimentale, 1925	
 L'Avenir de l'esthétique : essai sur l'objet d'une science naissante, F. Alcan, Coll. « Biblio. de Philosophie Contemporaine », 1929
 L'Instauration philosophique, 1939
 Les Différents modes d'existence, 1943 (new edition 2009)
 La Correspondance des arts, 1947
 L'Ombre de dieu, 1955
 Poésie française et la Peinture, 1966
 Clefs pour l'esthétique, 1970
 La Couronne d'herbes, 1975
 La Correspondance des arts, science de l'homme: éléments d'esthétique comparée, 1969
 L'Avenir de la philosophie, Gallimard, coll. « Idées », 1982 
 Les Deux Cent Mille Situations dramatiques, Flammarion, Paris, 1950
 L'Univers filmique, 1953

Collaborations
 Esthétique industrielle, avec Charles Lalo et d'autres, articles parus dans la Revue d'esthétique, juillet-décembre 1951
 Vocabulaire d'esthétique, avec Anne Souriau, PUF, coll. « Quadrige », 2004

References
 Luce de Vitry-Maubrey, La pensée cosmologique d'Étienne Souriau'', Paris, Klincksieck, 1974.

1892 births
1979 deaths
People from Lille
École Normale Supérieure alumni
Academic staff of the University of Lyon
Academic staff of the University of Paris
Philosophers of art
20th-century French philosophers
Members of the Académie des sciences morales et politiques
French male non-fiction writers
20th-century French male writers